Rabb is an unincorporated community in Conecuh County, Alabama, United States.

History
Rabb was named for William Rabb, Sr., who settled in the area in 1819.

A post office operated under the name Rabb from 1898 to 1918.

The Rabb Rosenwald School, which is thought to be the last remaining Rosenwald school in Conecuh County, is listed on the Alabama Register of Landmarks and Heritage.

References

Unincorporated communities in Conecuh County, Alabama
Unincorporated communities in Alabama